Río Tercero may refer to:
 Tercero River
 Río Tercero, Córdoba